The 2012 World Fencing Championships was held in Kyiv, Ukraine from 13–14 April. The only events were the women's team sabre and men's épée team, as these events are not included in the program of the 2012 London Olympics.

Results

Men

Women

Medal table

External links
 FIE
 Official website
 Different materials in Ukrainian

 
World Fencing Championships
W
World Fencing Championships
World Fencing Championships
International sports competitions hosted by Ukraine
Sports competitions in Kyiv
2010s in Kyiv
Fencing competitions in Ukraine